The Judith Mountains are located in central Montana in the Central Montana Alkalic Province in Fergus County, just to the northeast of Lewistown, Montana.

History
To the southeast of Judith Peak lies the remains of Fort Maginnis. Fort Maginnis was built in 1880 to protect the cattle ranches, the gold mining camps in and around the Judith Mountains and the Carroll Trail. The fort was constructed following the battle of the Little Bighorn.

In 1879, Granville Stuart  and his friend Samuel T. Hauser along with Helena banker Andrew J. Davis established the Davis, Hauser and Stuart (DHS) cattle company. The DHS Ranch was one of the largest open range cattle operations in the Central Montana prairie in the 1880s.

Mining and geology

The geology the range includes limestone, sandstone, and siltstone of Cambrian to Cretaceous age which were intruded by alkaline intrusives of monzonite, syenite to tinguaite composition of Cretaceous to Tertiary age. Epithermal gold and silver veins are found along the intrusive contacts.
 
The mountains were the center of gold and silver mining in the 1800s and current exploration continues. The old mining camps of Maiden and Gilt Edge were built during the mining boom in the 1880s and 1890s.

See also
 List of mountain ranges in Montana

References

External links
Judith Mountains

Mountain ranges of Montana
Landforms of Fergus County, Montana